In Wales, a trunk road agent,, is a partnership between two or more county and/or county borough councils for the purposes of managing, maintaining, and improving the network of trunk roads in Wales (including any motorways) in their respective areas on behalf of the Welsh Government.

Agents
During 2005 to 2006 three trunk road agents were established to replace the previous eight, they were the North Wales Trunk Road Agent, the Mid Wales Trunk Road Agent and the South Wales Trunk Road Agent. On 1 April 2012 these were reduced still further to two:

The North and Mid Wales Trunk Road Agent (NMWTRA),, which covered the counties of Anglesey, Ceredigion, Conwy, Denbighshire, Flintshire, Gwynedd (Lead Authority), Powys, and Wrexham.
The South Wales Trunk Road Agent (SWTRA),, which covered the counties of Blaenau Gwent, Bridgend, Caerphilly, Cardiff, Carmarthenshire, Merthyr Tydfil, Monmouthshire, Neath Port Talbot (Lead Authority), Newport, Pembrokeshire, Rhondda Cynon Taf , Swansea, Torfaen, and Vale of Glamorgan.

Traffic officers

Welsh Government traffic officers are civilian staff employed by the trunk road agents on behalf of the Welsh Government, as a means to ease traffic congestion on major trunk roads in Wales. Their role and powers are similar to their English counterparts working for National Highways, the National Highways traffic officers.

References

External links
North and Mid Wales Trunk Road Agent
South Wales Trunk Road Agent

Government of Wales
Law enforcement occupations in the United Kingdom
traffic management
Road transport in Wales